Hedges Pond is a  pond in the Cedarville section of Plymouth, Massachusetts with access from Hedges Pond Rd. The pond is located more than one mile (1.6 km) north of Cedarville's business district past the Route 3 underpass, southeast of Black Jimmy Pond (Hyles Pond), and east of Little Herring Pond. Hedges Pond has no private residences on its shores.

Camp Dennen once occupied the eastern shore of the pond. After studying the best way to provide recreational uses,
the town opened Hedges Pond Recreational Area and Preserve on July 16, 2011, having completed phase 1 which includes a lifeguarded sandy beach, a bathhouse, picnic areas, a small playground and walking trails. There will also be an area for launching small non-motorized boats.

Further development is expected to provide tennis, basketball, open fields, extended beaches and picnic areas, and more extensive trails. Rehabilitation of five existing cabins is expected to enable overnight stays to accommodate a revenue-generating eight-week summer day camp. During the weeks that the day camp is in operation the park would only be open to the public on weekends.

Hedges Pond was named after an American Indian, Will Hedge, the original owner of the town site.

References

External links
Environmental Protection Agency
South Shore Coastal Watersheds - Lake Assessments

Ponds of Plymouth, Massachusetts
Ponds of Massachusetts